Corvoidea is a superfamily of birds in the order of Passeriformes.

Systematics

Corvoidea contains the following families:

 Vireonidae – vireos
 Rhipiduridae – fantails
 Dicruridae – drongos
 Monarchidae – monarch flycatchers
 Ifritidae – blue-capped ifrit
 Paradisaeidae – birds-of-paradise
 Corcoracidae – white-winged chough and apostlebird
 Melampittidae – melampittas
 Laniidae – shrikes
 Platylophidae - jayshrike
 Corvidae – crows, ravens, and jays

References

Passeri
Bird superfamilies
Extant Eocene first appearances